George Cashel Stoney (July 1, 1916 – July 12, 2012) was an American documentary filmmaker, educator, and the "father of public-access television." Among his films were Palmour Street, A Study of Family Life (1949), All My Babies (1953), How the Myth Was Made (1979) and The Uprising of '34 (1995). All My Babies was entered into the National Film Registry in 2002. Stoney's life and work were the subject of a Festschrift volume of the journal Wide Angle in 1999.

Early life 
George Cashel Stoney was born in 1916  in Winston-Salem, North Carolina. He studied English and History at the University of North Carolina and graduated in 1937. Later studying at Balliol College in Oxford, and received a Film in Education Certificate from the University of London. He worked at the Henry Street Settlement House on the Lower East Side of NYC in 1938, as a field research assistant for Gunnar Myrdal and Ralph Bunche's on their publication An American Dilemma: The Negro Problem and Modern Democracy. He was also a publicist for the Farm Security Administration covering the plight of tenant farmers until he was drafted in 1942. Throughout this time he also wrote freelance articles for many newspapers and magazines, including the New York Times, The New Republic,  Raleigh News and Observer and the Survey Graphic. He served as a photo intelligence officer in World War II.

Film career 
In 1946, Stoney joined the Southern Educational Film Service, writing and directing government education films for their constituents. Shooting in North Carolina, he worked on Mr. Williams Wakes up in 1944, and Tar Heel Family in 1951 under the company. He went on to create films for the Association of Medical Colleges and the North Carolina Film Board. In 1953, Stoney worked with the Association of Medical Colleges to write, direct and produce All My Babies: A Midwife's Own Story. The film follows Mary Francis Hill Coley an African American midwife as she attends to her clients and work with doctors and nurses within the medical establishment to promote education and cooperation within the modern medical field. The film received numerous awards and was inducted into the National Film Registry in 2002 by the Library of Congress.

In the late 1960s, Stoney founded his own production company, George C. Stoney Associates, and taught at Columbia University, Stanford University (1965–67), and became a professor at New York University's Tisch School of the Arts in 1971. He was an emeritus professor at NYU until his death. He directed the Challenge for Change project, a socially active documentary production wing of the National Film Board of Canada from 1968-70.  After working with Red Burns on the Challenge for a Change, the pair founded the Alternate Media Center in 1972, which trained citizens in the tools of video production for a brand new medium, Public-access television. An early advocate of democratic media, Stoney is often cited as being the "father of public-access television." With his work in public-access television, Stoney sought to democratize of voices recorded on an audiovisual medium by sharing authority through community engagement.

In 1995, Stoney directed The Uprising of '34 about the General Textile Strike in 1934. For the film's production, over 300 hours of interviews from former mill workers, their children and grandchildren, labor organizers, mill owners, and others who experienced or were affected by the strikes.

Legacy and Death 
Stoney was an active member of the Board of Directors for the Manhattan Neighborhood Network (MNN) and the Alliance for Community Media (ACM).  Each year, the ACM presents "The George Stoney Award" to an organization or individual who has made an outstanding contribution to championing the growth and experience of humanistic community communications.

He died peacefully at the age of 96 at his home in New York City.

Filmography 

Mr. Williams Wakes Up (1944) Writer
Feeling All Right! (1948) Writer
 Palmour Street, A Study of Family Life (1949) Writer/Director/Producer
 Tar Heel Family (1951) Writer/Director/Producer
 Land and Life (1949) Writer/Director/Producer
 A Concept of Maternal and Neonatal Care (1950) Director/Producer
 Birthright (1951) Writer
 The American Road (1953) Director
 All My Babies: A Midwife's Own Story (1953) Writer/Director/Producer
 Angels with Silver Wings (1953) Director/Producer
 The Invader (1955) Director
 The Secrets of the Heart (1955)
 The Boy Who Saw Through (1956) Director
 Proud Years (1956) Writer/Director
 Second Chance (1956)
 Hail The Hearty (1956) Producer
 Cerebral Vascular Disease: The Challenge of Management (1959)
 Booked for Safekeeping (1960) Writer/Director
 The Cry for Help (1962)
 The Mask (1963)
 The Newcomers (1963)
 Under Pressure (1964)
 The Man in the Middle (1966)
 You Are on Indian Land (1969) Producer
 VTR St-Jacques (1969) Producer
 Up Against the System (1969) Producer
 These Are My People... (1969) Producer
 The Prince Edward Island Development Plan, Part 1: Ten Days in September (1969) Producer
 The Prince Edward Island Development Plan, Part 2: Four Days in March (1969) Producer
 Mrs Case (1969) Producer
 A Young Social Worker Speaks Her Mind (1969) Producer
 Occupation (1970) Producer
 Introduction to Labrador (1970) Producer
 I Don't Think It's Meant for Us (1971) Producer
 God Help the Man Who Would Part with His Land (1971) Director
 When I Go. That's It! (1972) Director/Producer
 Hudson Shad (1974)
 Planning for Floods (1974)
 The Shepherd of the Night Flock (1975) Director/Producer
 How the Myth Was Made: A Study of Robert Flaherty's Man of Aran (1978) Director/Producer
 Acupuncture and Herbal Medicine (1978)
 In China Family Planning is No Private Matter (1978)
 The Weavers: Wasn't That a Time (1981) Producer
 Southern Voices: A Composer's Exploration with Sorrel Doris Hays (1985) Director
How One Painter Sees (1988)
 We Shall Overcome (1989) Producer
 The Uprising of '34 (1995) Director
 Race or Reason: The Bellport Dilemma (2003) Producer
Flesh in Ecstasy: Gaston Lachaise and the Woman He Loved (2009) Director w David Bagnall
 What's Organic About Organic? (2010) Consulting Producer

References

Further reading
 Biography associated with screenings of Stoney's films at the Museum of Modern Art in 2009, which Stoney attended.

External links

1916 births
2012 deaths
National Film Board of Canada people
American documentary film producers
American public access television
New York University faculty
Columbia University faculty
Film educators
University of North Carolina at Chapel Hill alumni
People from Winston-Salem, North Carolina
Alumni of Balliol College, Oxford